The Kubok Obschestva Velosipednoy Ezdy(Bicycle Ride Society Cup) or Gonka Motorov(Race of engines) was a Grand Prix motor race held in Russian Empire on October 11, 1898.

Track
First motor race in Russia had begun near the Aleksandrovo station. Drivers reached Strelna and then went back to the Aleksandrovo. A distance was 41 km. It was difficult to drive that day, because the road was covered with snow.

Competitors
Seven cars were ready to start the race. The first starter was V.I. von Lode, but he crashed his car after it collided with a horse. The second starter was Shneyderov, then Stepanov started. Belyaev was 4th, Mazi – 5th. French Alfonso Merl started after Mazi. This six starters used Clement car. The last starter, Lavrentyev used Benz car. It was heavier than 98 kg, which is why his car was not classified. Its weight was about 848 kg.

Classification

Sources
http://sundry.wmsite.ru/avtomobilnye-istorii/pavel-nikolaevich-beljaev
http://www.zr.ru/archive/zr/1928/09/avtomobil-nyi-sport-v-staroi-rossii-i-v-sssr

Auto races in Russia
1898 in motorsport
1898 in the Russian Empire
October 1898 sports events